Margaret H. Bair is a retired brigadier general in the United States Air National Guard and was the Chief of Staff of the Wisconsin Air National Guard.

Biography
She has three children. While not serving in the military she works as a registered nurse in Lake Geneva, Wisconsin.

Career
Bair originally joined the United States Air Force in 1976. While on active duty, her assignments included serving at Andrews Air Force Base. Following her time on active duty, she joined the United States Air Force Reserve and the Montana Air National Guard and eventually became the commander of the Medical Group of the 128th Air Refueling Wing of the Wisconsin Air National Guard. She was promoted to Brigadier General in 2009 by Jim Doyle.

References

People from Lake Geneva, Wisconsin
Military personnel from Wisconsin
Wisconsin National Guard personnel
National Guard (United States) generals
Female generals of the United States Air Force
Living people
American nurses
American women nurses
Year of birth missing (living people)
21st-century American women